Mitsuo Sawamoto (澤本 光男 Sawamoto Mitsuo, December 12, 1954) is a Japanese chemist specializing in the field of polymer chemistry, Emeritus Professor at Kyoto University, professor at Chubu University.

He is co-recipient of the Franklin Institute Award in Chemistry in 2017 with Krzysztof Matyjaszewski, for their independent discover of Atom-transfer radical-polymerization (ATRP).

Early life and education

Sawamoto was born in Kyoto, Japan, on December 12, 1954. He received his BSc, MSc and PhD degree in 1974, 1976 and 1979, respectively, from Kyoto University.

Career
From 1980 to 1981, he worked as a postdoctoral scientist at the University of Akron, becoming a professor at Akron in 1981. A decade later, he moved to the Graduate School of Engineering of Kyoto University, where he was a professor of polymer chemistry.

From 2008 to 2010 Sawamoto was president of The Society of Polymer Science, Japan (SPSJ). He is currently a member of the Science Council of Japan. He is one of the editors of Journal of Polymer Science Part A.

Research
Sawamoto discovered the world's first living cationic polymerization and developed numerous initiator systems (Macromolecules, 1984; Progress in Polymer Science, 1991). In addition, he realized the world's first living free-radical polymerization by a metal complex and developed numerous initiator systems (Macromolecules, 1995; Chemical Reviews, 2001).

In 1995, Sawamoto and Krzysztof Matyjaszewski described Atom-transfer radical-polymerization (ATRP) almost simultaneously and independently.

Until 2008, Sawamoto published more than 350 original works and more than 30 systematic reviews. Among them, in the field of organic chemistry, his total citation times (1997-2001) was ranked first in Japan, and third in the world.

This series of research inspired many studies internationally in not only polymer chemistry but also related fields such as organometallic chemistry, and its ripple effect is particularly noticeable.

Sawamoto was given a quote in March 2011:
Miraculous, ingenious, creative but sincere:This is catalytic science research is all about.

Recognition
 1997: The Award of the Society of Polymer Science, Japan
 1999: The Award of the Chemical Society of Japan
 2002: The Arthur K. Doolittle Award (Royal Society of Chemistry)
 2012: Macro Group UK Medal for Outstanding Achievementin Polymer Science
 2013: SPSJ Award for Outstanding Achievement in Polymer Science and Technology
 2014: NIMS Award
 2015: Medal with Purple Ribbon
 2016: Humboldt Prize
 2017: Franklin Institute Award in Chemistry
 2021: Clarivate Citation Laureates

See also

 Atom-transfer radical-polymerization
 Copper(0)-mediated reversible-deactivation radical polymerization
 Diethylzinc

References

External links
 Mitsuo SAWAMOTO  
 Sawamoto Laboratory   
 Mitsuo Sawamoto, Kyoto University, Japan

1954 births
Academic staff of Kyoto University
Kyoto University alumni
People from Kyoto
Polymer scientists and engineers
Living people